Casablanca railway station may refer to:

 Casa-Voyageurs railway station,  the main terminus and hub
 Casa-Port railway station, a secondary terminus serving suburban lines and the port
 Oasis railway station, serving suburban lines